Thomas James "TJ" Schiller (born October 17, 1986) is a Canadian freestyle skier. Schiller combines amplitude with style and is best known for his signature switch 1080 mute grab. During Winter X Games XIV, Schiller became the first person to land a double cork 1620 (four and a half rotations with two flips). Behind Henrik Harlaut and Andrew Taylor, he is the third person to land a 1620 of any kind in competition. Schiller is the head skier of the Canadian freestyle team.

Sponsors
Nordica Skis and Boots, Nike 6.0, Monster Energy, POC Protection, Dragon, Grenade, Fresh sports, Seirus,

Results
 2010   2nd Winter X Games         Aspen, CO          Big Air
 2009   1st Winter X Games       Aspen, CO              Slopestyle
 2007 	2nd King Of Style 	Stockholm, Swe 	 	Big Air
 2007 	7th Icer Air 	San Francisco, Ca 	 	Big Air
 2007 	1st Freestyle.ch 	Zurich, Sui 	 	Big Air
 2007 	1st Wsi 	Whistler, Bc Can 	 	Big Air
 2007 	3rd Jon Olsson Invitational 	Are, Swe 	 	Big Air
 2007 	4th Us Open 	Cooper, Co 	 	Big Air
 2006     1st Winter X Games  Aspen, CO    Best Trick
 2006 	1st Icer Air 	San Francisco, Ca 	 	Big Air
 2006 	5th Freestyle.ch 	Zurich, Sui 	 	Big Air
 2006 	3rd Jon Olsson Invitational 	Are, Swe 	 	Big Air
 2006 	3rd Total Fight Masters Of Freestyle 	Andorra 	 	Slopestyle
 2006 	9th World Skiing Invitational 	Whistler, Bc Can 	 	Superpipe
 2006 	2nd World Skiing Invitational 	Whistler, Bc Can 	 	Big Air
 2006 	2nd Orage European Freeskiing Open 	Laax, Sui 	 	Slopestyle
 2006 	2nd Paul Mitchell Aft 	Big Bear, Ca 	 	Slopestyle
 2006 	5th Paul Mitchell Aft 	Breckenridge, Co 	 	Slopestyle
 2006 	1st Us Open 	Vail, Co 	 	Big Air
 2006 	6th Us Open 	Vail, Co 	 	Slopestyle
 2005 	3rd Icer Air 	San Francisco, Ca 	 	Big Air
 2005 	9th World Ski Invitational 	Whistler, Bc Can 	 	Superpipe
 2005 	1st World Ski Invitational 	Whistler, Bc Can 	 	Slopestyle
 2005 	3rd Jon Olsson Invitational 	Are, Swe 	 	Big Air
 2005 	1st Gravity Games 	Copper Mtn, Co 	 	Slopestyle
 2005 	5th Gravity Games 	Copper Mtn, Co 	 	Superpipe
 2005 	1st Us Open 	Vail, Co 	 	Big Air
 2005 	11th Us Open 	Vail, Co 	 	Slopestyle
 2004 	1st Ultimate Bumps And Jumps 	Steamboat Springs, Co 	 	Overall
 2004 	4th Ultimate Bumps And Jumps 	Steamboat Springs, Co 	 	Moguls
 2004 	1st Ultimate Bumps And Jumps 	Steamboat Springs, Co 	 	Big Air
 2004 	3rd World Skiing Invitational 	Whistler, Bc Can 	 	Big Air
 2004 	4th World Skiing Invitational 	Whistler, Bc Can 	 	Superpipe
 2004 	6th World Skiing Invitational 	Whistler, Bc Can 	 	Rail Session
 2004 	1st Us Open 	Vail, Co 	 	Slopestyle
 2004 	2nd US Open 	Vail, Co 	 	Big Air

References

External links
 Official website

1986 births
Living people
Canadian male freestyle skiers
Olympic Games broadcasters
People from Vernon, British Columbia
X Games athletes